The Adventurer may refer to:

Film and television
 The Adventurer (1917 film), a short comedy film written and directed by Charlie Chaplin
 The Adventurer (1920 film), starring William Farnum
 The Adventurer (1922 film), a German silent film directed by Lothar Mendes
 The Adventurer (1928 film), an American adventure film directed by Viktor Tourjansky and W.S. Van Dyke
 The Adventurer: The Curse of the Midas Box, a 2014 British film
 The Adventurer (TV series), a 1972 British TV series

Other uses
 The Adventurer (magazine), a games magazine from LucasArts
 The Adventurer (newspaper), an English 18th century newspaper
 The Adventurer (novel), a 1948 novel by Mika Waltari
 The Adventurer (album), an album by saxophonist Clifford Jordan

See also
 The Adventurer's, a 1980 Hong Kong TV series
 The Adventurers (disambiguation)
 Adventurers (disambiguation)
 Adventurer (disambiguation)
 Conan the Adventurer (disambiguation)